Farm Island Township is a township in Aitkin County, Minnesota, United States. The population was 1,099 as of the 2010 census.

Etymology
Farm Island takes its name from a lake island of the same name, which was cultivated by the Ojibwe people.

History

During the period 1896–1912, the community was served by a post office named Dorris. The community is still referred to by some as Dorris. The historic Cedar Lake Lutheran Church and adjacent cemetery are both locally referred to by the name Dorris. Early immigrants in the area include the Roms (Carlsons), Dummers, Rudes (Ruds) and Petersons. In 2006 the Rom Poultry Farm ended their egg business. Much of the land was originally transferred to the railroad, and subsequently sold to settlers. The terrain reminded the surveyors of Switzerland, and so named the Switzerland Trail (now Township Road 96).

The township's Pine-Hickory Lakes Roadside Parking Area was developed as a New Deal project from 1937 to 1938 and has been listed on the National Register of Historic Places.

Geography
The terrain of the township contrasts with much of Aitkin County.

Major highway

 U.S. Highway 169

Lakes
 Anderson Lake
 Apple Lake
 Bachelor Lake
 Black Shadow Lake
 Blue Lake (south three-quarters)
 Brennen Lake
 Camp Lake
 Carlson Lake
 Cedar Lake (southeast half)
 Christmas Lake
 Diamond Lake
 Drain Lake
 Dummer Lake
 Farm Island Lake (north three-quarters)
 Hammal Lake
 Hanging Kettle Lake
 Hickory Lake
 Hill Lake
 Horseshoe Lake
 Landgren Lake
 Little Pete Lake
 Little Pine Lake
 Lake Four
 Lake Three
 Long Lake
 Pine Island Lake
 Prescott Lake
 Ripple Lake (west edge)
 Round Lake
 Seth Lake (west edge)
 Spirit Lake
 Sunset Lake
 Taylor Lake
 Thornton Lake
 Town Line Lake
 Townhall Lake
 Vorse Lake

Adjacent townships
 Aitkin Township (north)
 Spencer Township (northeast)
 Nordland Township (east)
 Wealthwood Township (southeast)
 Hazelton Township (south)
 Bay Lake Township, Crow Wing County (southwest)
 Deerwood Township, Crow Wing County (west)
 Rabbit Lake Township, Crow Wing County (northwest)

Cemeteries
The township contains these two cemeteries: Diamond Lake and Dorris.

Demographics
As of the census of 2000, there were 1,071 people, 434 households, and 335 families residing in the township. The racial makeup of the township was 98.04% White, 0.28% African American, 0.28% Native American, 0.09% Asian, 0.56% from other races, and 0.75% from two or more races. Hispanic or Latino of any race were 0.19% of the population.

There were 434 households, out of which 25.6% had children under the age of 18 living with them, 71.4% were married couples living together, 3.5% had a female householder with no husband present, and 22.8% were non-families. 19.1% of all households were made up of individuals, and 9.0% had someone living alone who was 65 years of age or older. The average household size was 2.47 and the average family size was 2.79.

In the township the population was spread out, with 21.5% under the age of 18, 5.5% from 18 to 24, 20.4% from 25 to 44, 32.9% from 45 to 64, and 19.7% who were 65 years of age or older. The median age was 47 years. For every 100 females, there were 108.0 males. For every 100 females age 18 and over, there were 107.7 males.

The median income for a household in the township was $60,882, and the median income for a family was $74,375. Males had a median income of $64,000 versus $40,673 for females. The per capita income for the township was $30,067. About 6.6% of families and 7.0% of the population were below the poverty line, including 8.7% of those under age 18 and 14.1% of those age 65 or over.

References
 United States National Atlas
 United States Census Bureau 2007 TIGER/Line Shapefiles
 United States Board on Geographic Names (GNIS)

Townships in Aitkin County, Minnesota
Townships in Minnesota